is a Japanese manga written by Seiman Douman. It was serialized in Young Champion Retsu from January 2017 to July 2019 and published in a single volume in September 2019.

Publication
Written and illustrated by Seiman Douman, the series began serialization in Young Champion Retsu on January 17, 2017. The series completed its serialization on July 16, 2019. The individual chapters were collected into a single tankōbon volume, which was released on September 19, 2019.

In April 2020, Seven Seas Entertainment announced they licensed the series for English publication. They released the volume on December 1, 2020.

Reception
Grant Jones from Anime News Network praised the plot due to its balancing of its elements, while also feeling it can be aimless at points. Jones also felt the story was too short to delve into some of its aspects.

In 2020, the series won the Seiun Award for best comic.

See also
Nickelodeon, another manga series by the same author
The Voynich Hotel, another manga series by the same author

References

Further reading

External links
 

Akita Shoten manga
Science fiction anime and manga
Seinen manga
Seven Seas Entertainment titles